Summer Magic may refer to:
 Summer Magic (film), a 1963 Walt Disney Productions family musical film
 Summer Magic (EP), an EP by Red Velvet
 Summer Magic (song), a song by Ai
 Summer Magic, a 1994 set of Magic: The Gathering cards